High Forest Township is a township in Olmsted County, Minnesota, United States. The population was 1,085 at the 2000 census.

High Forest Township was organized in 1858.

Geography 

Demographics 
As of the census of 2000, there were 1,085 people, 377 households, and 317 families residing in the township. There were 384 housing units at an average density of 9.3/sq mi (3.6/km2). The racial makeup of the township was 99.35% White, 0.18% Asian, 0.09% from other races, and 0.37% from two or more races. Hispanic or Latino of any race were 1.11% of the population.

There were 377 households, out of which 39.5% had children under the age of 18 living with them, 75.3% were married couples living together, 3.7% had a female householder with no husband present, and 15.9% were non-families. 12.7% of all households were made up of individuals, and 5.6% had someone living alone who was 65 years of age or older. The average household size was 2.88 and the average family size was 3.14.

In the township the population was spread out, with 30.0% under the age of 18, 5.3% from 18 to 24, 28.9% from 25 to 44, 26.7% from 45 to 64, and 9.1% who were 65 years of age or older. The median age was 38 years. For every 100 females, there were 105.5 males. For every 100 females age 18 and over, there were 107.1 males.

The median income for a household in the township was $56,818, and the median income for a family was $58,750. Males had a median income of $38,929 versus $27,188 for females. The per capita income for the township was $22,524. About 2.4% of families and 5.2% of the population were below the poverty line, including 5.7% of those under age 18 and 8.7% of those age 65 or over.

Notable person
Prolific film and television character actor William Fawcett (1894-1974) grew up in High Forest Township and is interred with his wife, Helene, in Roselawn Cemetery in Roseville, Minnesota.

Artist and author Nicholas R. Brewer (1857–1949) was born on a farm just west of High Forest. His book, "Trails of a Paintbrush" is an especially engaging story of an artist’s education and rise to success. From his beginnings on a pioneering Minnesota farm, Brewer was curious, industrious, and responsive to nature. Moving to St. Paul and later New York, he had little formal training but learned quickly from his many artist friends and acquaintances, including Homer Dodge Martin and George Inness. Brewer eventually became nationally known as a landscape artist and portraitist, dubbed “the Abraham Lincoln of American art.”

References

Townships in Olmsted County, Minnesota
Rochester metropolitan area, Minnesota
Townships in Minnesota